The 62nd 500 Mile International Sweepstakes was held at the Indianapolis Motor Speedway in Speedway, Indiana on Sunday, May 28, 1978. Danny Ongais dominated the early stages of the race but eventually dropped out with a blown engine. Al Unser Sr. dominated the second half, and held a large lead late in the race. However, Unser bent the front wing of his Lola during a pit stop on lap 180, causing his handling to go away over the final twenty laps. Second place Tom Sneva charged to catch Unser's crippled Lola but came up 8 seconds short at the finish line – the second-closest finish in Indy history to that point. Unser held off the challenge, and became a three-time winner of the 500. It was Al Unser's third Indy victory in the decade of the 1970s, and the fifth of nine overall victories by the Unser family.

Al Unser Sr. entered the month having won the 1977 California 500 at Ontario the previous September. Later in the 1978 season, Unser would go on to win the Pocono 500 and the California 500, sweeping the "triple crown" of Indy car racing. As of 2019 he is the only driver in history to do so in the same season, and coupled with the win at Ontario in 1977, set a record by winning four straight 500-mile Indy car races.

Second year driver Janet Guthrie finished ninth, and it was later revealed she drove with a broken wrist. It was the highest finish for a female driver in Indy history until Danica Patrick finished in fourth place in 2005. During time trials, Tom Sneva, who had broken the 200 mph barrier a year earlier, bettered his own record. This time he managed to complete all four qualifying laps over 200 mph, setting once again new one and four lap records.

Tony Hulman, the popular owner and president of the track since 1945, died the previous October. His widow Mary F. Hulman was named the chairperson of the board of the Speedway, and for the first time she delivered the famous starting command. Along with the death of Tony Hulman, the race was held just five weeks after eight USAC officials were killed in a plane crash. With dissent increasing among the participants about organizational issues and poor revenue, the 1978 race would be the final Indy 500 contested prior to the formation of CART and prior to the first open wheel "split."

Al Unser's victory was the first Indy triumph for the Cosworth DFX V8 engine. The British-based engine building company would go on to win the Indianapolis 500 for ten consecutive years.

Race schedule

Practice and time trials
On Wednesday May 10, Mario Andretti turned a practice lap of 201.838 mph, faster than the track record. Minutes later, Danny Ongais upped the best speed to 201.974 mph. On Thursday May 11, rookie Rick Mears (200.0 mph) also joined the coveted "200 mph club" in practice. Johnny Rutherford (199.2 mph) and A. J. Foyt (199.158 mph) were also within striking distance.

On Friday May 12, the final day of practice before pole qualifying was scheduled to be held, Mario Andretti shattered the unofficial track record, turning a lap of 203.482 mph. Also over 200 mph were Mears, Rutherford, and Foyt. Tom Sneva, the driver who broke the 200 mph barrier a year earlier, was the slowest of the three Penske cars, managing only a 196.3 mph lap during practice.

The first weekend of time trials was scheduled for May 13–14. Rain washed out the entire first weekend, and pole qualifying was moved to Saturday May 20.

The rainout complicated the schedule for Mario Andretti. He was forced to leave the track and fly to Zolder for the Grand Prix of Belgium. Arrangements were being made for another driver to qualify the car for him, and he would return to the cockpit for race day. With no track activity possible at Indy for Sunday, A. J. Foyt flew to Talladega and finished third in the NASCAR Winston 500.

During the second week of practice, Pancho Carter and Tom Sneva joined the "200 mph club." Sneva had a hand-timed lap of about 203.1 mph, inching closer to Andretti's mark from the previous week. Danny Ongais destroyed his primary car in a crash in turn four on Tuesday May 16. He was not seriously injured, but would have to qualify with his back-up car.

Pole Day – Saturday May 20

Pole day dawned with temperatures in the high 70s and low 80s. Qualifying started promptly at 11:00 a.m., with Johnny Rutherford first out on the track. He fell short of the 200 mph barrier on all four laps, and settled for an average of 197.098 mph.

At 12:03 p.m., Tom Sneva took to the track. Following in his own footsteps from the previous year, he set new all-time one and four lap track records. This time becoming the first driver in Indy history to complete all four qualifying laps over 200 mph.
 Lap 1 – 44.20 seconds, 203.620 mph (new 1-lap track record)
 Lap 2 – 44.43 seconds, 202.566 mph
 Lap 3 – 44.60 seconds, 201.794 mph
 Lap 4 – 44.85 seconds, 200.669 mph
 Total – 2:58.08, 202.156 mph (new 4-lap track record)
Due to changes in the rules in subsequent years, his one and four lap track records would stand until 1982. Sneva's four-lap average secured the pole position, his second pole in a row.

Sneva's Penske teammate, rookie Rick Mears, was the next car out. Mears completed three laps over 200 mph, and his four-lap average of 200.078 mph was a rookie speed record, and would be good enough for the front row.

Janet Guthrie returned for her second start, and qualified strongly at 190.325 mph. At 12:39 p.m., Danny Ongais made it an "all 200 mph" front row, securing second starting position at 200.122 mph.

After practicing over 200 mph, A. J. Foyt was forced to wave off his run, and missed his chance to qualify in the pole round. Mike Hiss was hired by Penske to drive substitute for Mario Andretti during time trials. He qualified the car with a respectable speed of 194.647 mph (8th). However, on race day, Andretti would get back in the car, and he would be forced to line up in the 33rd starting position due to the driver switch.

Rain late in the day hampered the qualifying attempts. The trip through the original qualifying line exhausted at 5 p.m., and Tom Sneva officially secured the pole position. Several drivers including Bobby Unser, A. J. Foyt, and Pancho Carter, were unable to qualify during the pole round. At 5 p.m., the "third day" of time trials officially commenced, and those drivers would line up behind the cars from the pole round.

The day ended with the field filled to twenty cars. Bobby Unser finished his run as a "third day" qualifier in the rain. The track was closed for the day as soon as Unser returned to the pits at 5:11 p.m.

Bump Day – Sunday May 21
The final day of time trials opened with 13 spots unfilled. A. J. Foyt (200.120 mph) was the fastest of the day. His speed was tied for second-fastest, but as a final day qualifier, he would line up 20th.

Roger Rager was the only major on-track incident of the day. On his second warm-up lap, he hit the outside wall in turn four, suffering an injured hand. He would miss the race. Larry Cannon brushed the wall on his second qualifying lap, and Dick Simon brushed the wall on the main stretch shaking down a car for Bill Puterbaugh. The car lost two wheels and it was too late in the day for the car to be repaired.

In the final hour, there was one spot left in the field when Bob Harkey was preparing to make his attempt. Jim Hurtubise, who had once again entered his now-infamous Mallard/Offy front-engined car, had been denied the permission to qualify, due to lack of speed. USAC had decided to set a 180 mph minimum speed in order to pass "final" inspection, receive the appropriate sticker, and be allowed to make a qualifying attempt. They deemed Hurtubise ineligible, claiming he had not broken 175 mph, despite some claiming he had lapped over 184 mph. Hurtubise considered the ruling a personal harassment, lies, and an effort by USAC, Goodyear, and the Speedway to single him out and keep him from qualifying. After being a popular fixture amongst the fans for many years, several episodes of antics had caused some to begin to view Hurtubise unfavorably. Hurtubise got into a heated exchange with chief steward Tom Binford, then proceeded to climb into Harkey's car, shouting "If I can't qualify, no one can!" After a few minutes, Hurtubise was coaxed out of the car, and Harkey climbed in to crank it up. With some encouragement from the crowd, Hurtubise then jumped in front of Harkey, preventing him from pulling out of the pits. He had to be restrained by safety patrol members, and Harkey managed to pull away. While Harkey was on the backstretch of his warm-up lap, Hurtubise jumped over the pit wall and ran out on the race track in order to disrupt and halt the qualifying attempt. Running down the main stretch, several guards chased after him. Hurtubise was tackled by John Martin and was then detained by police. By this time, the crowd's opinion had changed, and they began booing and jeering Hurtubise for going too far by disrupting qualifying. Hurtubise was banned from the track for the remainder of the month.

Harkey managed to finish his qualifying attempt without incident, but his speed was not fast enough to stand. Within twenty minutes, Harkey was bumped by Joe Saldana. The day closed with Cliff Hucul bumping Graham McRae with two minutes left in the day.

After missing time trials, Mario Andretti won the Grand Prix of Belgium. He traveled back to Indianapolis during the week, and would be back in time for Carburetion Day "tests."

Starting lineup

Grid

 Driver Mike Hiss qualified Mario's car for him while he was in Belgium winning the Belgian Grand Prix. After qualifying Mike Hiss stepped aside from the ride so Mario would race the car on race day. Because of the driver change USAC rules stated the entry must start at the rear of the field (33rd)

Alternates
 First alternate: Graham McRae (#33, #34) – Bumped
 Second alternate: Bob Harkey (#42) – Bumped

Failed to qualify
 Al Loquasto (#86) – Bumped
 Larry "Boom Boom" Cannon (#85) – Too slow
 Bill Vukovich Jr. (#18, #93) – Incomplete qualifying run
 John Martin (#28) – Incomplete qualifying runs
 Bubby Jones (#18) – Incomplete qualifying runs
 Gary Irvin  (#9) – Incomplete qualifying run
 Roger Rager  (#9, #97) – Wrecked during qualifying attempt
 Mike Hiss (#7, #66) – qualified 8th, but turned the car over to Mario Andretti
 Lee Kunzman (#90)
 Bobby Olivero (#78)
 Eldon Rasmussen (#58)
 Jim Hurtubise – Barred from making a qualifying attempt due to lack of speed; detained by police after running out onto the track to disrupt time trials.

 = Indianapolis 500 rookie = Former Indianapolis 500 winner

Race summary

Start
Race day dawned hot and humid, with temperatures in the high 80s (°F). After the death of Tony Hulman, the starting command was recited by his widow Mary F. Hulman. With Janet Guthrie in the field once again, the traditional command was again tweaked. This time command was worded "Lady and Gentlemen, start your engines!"

During the pace laps, Gary Bettenhausen pulled into the pits with mechanical trouble, and missed the start. At the green flag, Danny Ongais darted into the lead, with Tom Sneva falling in line behind him in second. Rick Mears suddenly faded and pulled to the outside, and was passed by several cars. Ongais completed the first lap at a record speed of 185.185 mph.

Sheldon Kinser stalled on the backstretch, and brought out the yellow light for three laps. Rick Mears ducked into the pits for an unscheduled stop. He had neglected to fasten his helmet strap properly, and nearly lost his helmet at the start of the race. He was able to properly fasten his helmet, and returned to the race.

The green came back out on lap 5, with Ongais pulling out to a comfortable lead. Cliff Hucul went to pits, and was out of the race with a broken oil line.

First half
Mario Andretti quickly charged from last starting position to run as high as 13th in the early going. However, he was forced to pit to change a bad spark plug wire. He lost 8 laps, and was effectively out of contention for the rest of the day.

On lap 26, Spike Gehlhausen crashed exiting turn 2, and came to rest along the outside wall on the backstretch. Leader Danny Ongais was in the pits when the yellow came out, which gave the lead temporarily to Steve Krisiloff. However, under the yellow light condition, Krisiloff violated the PACER light rules, and was penalized one lap. That gave the lead to Tom Sneva. With Ongais in second right behind Sneva, the green light came back on down the backstretch on lap 31. Sneva led for barely a lap, and Ongais passed him for the lead the next time by.

Salt Walther dropped out with a bad clutch, and proceeded to rant his frustration of his chief mechanic Tommy Smith during a heated television interview. It was reported that Smith made a change to the throttling system the night before the race; while Walther's team worked on repairing the car, Smith reportedly left the track, having parted ways with the team.

Danny Ongais led 68 of the first 75 laps. The team reported that Ongais had lost his two-way radio, and was forced to communicate only by sign boards for the rest of the race.

Al Unser Sr. took the lead for the first time on lap 76. he held the lead at the halfway point. A. J. Foyt, who had charged near the front early on, started to fade, and after long pit stops, was laps down to the leaders. Janet Guthrie, on the other hand, was moving up into the top ten.

Second half
Rookie Rick Mears dropped out after 103 laps with a blown engine. By lap 120, thirteen cars were out of the race, with hot conditions contributing to the attrition.

Al Unser Sr. led, with Danny Ongais and Tom Sneva in the top three. Unser continued to hold a small lead over Ongais, with his crew's efficient and quick pit stops increasing the margin.

Suddenly on lap 145, second place Danny Ongais came into the pits with smoke pouring from the car. After having led 71 laps (nearly half the race up to that point), Ongais was out with a blown engine.

Finish
Al Unser Sr. led second place Tom Sneva by over 20 seconds. Those were the only two cars left on the lead lap. On lap 180, Unser came onto the pits for his final stop. Unser overshot his pit box by a few feet, and hit a spare tire with his front wing. The team decided not to change tires, and filled the car with fuel only. His stop was 17 seconds, his worst pit stop of the day.

One lap later, Tom Sneva pitted, taking fuel only. His pit stop, however, was not fast, and he did not immediately gain ground on Unser. With a 30-second lead, Unser had 19 laps to victory. However, his front wing was damaged from hitting the tire, and Unser's handling was starting to go away. Sneva began cutting away at his lead, by about a second per lap.

With three laps to go, Sneva had cut the lead to 14 seconds. Then with one lap to go, it was down to 10 seconds.
On the final lap, third place Gordon Johncock slipped by Unser to get one of his laps back. Unser nursed the car around on the final lap, and won this third Indy 500. Second place for the second year in a row Tom Sneva finished 8.09 seconds behind, the second-closest finish in Indy history to that point.

Wally Dallenbach and A. J. Foyt both stalled on the course out of fuel, but both finished strongly, 5th and 7th, respectively. Janet Guthrie finished 9th, and revealed after the race that she drove with a fractured wrist. Two days before the race, she fell during a charity tennis match, suffering the injury.

Late in the race, the Patrick Racing Wildcats of Gordon Johncock and Steve Krisiloff were penalized one lap by stewards - Johncock for running over an air-hose, and Krisiloff for speeding too fast under caution. If the penalties had not happened, Johncock would have barely finished runner-up behind Al Unser, and Krisiloff would have still finished fourth, but would have been the only driver one lap down. George Bignotti announced his intentions to protest Johncock's penalty, claiming that officials overlooked Unser running over his air-hose, and did not treat both drivers equally. However, post-race footage showed that Unser, although coming very close, did not run over his air-hose, and the team declined to protest.

Results

Box score

 = Indianapolis 500 rookie = Former Indianapolis 500 winner

Statistics

Points standings after the race

Broadcasting

Radio
The race was carried live on the IMS Radio Network. Paul Page served as anchor for the second year despite what happened on December 1, 1977. On that day while he was doing a helicopter traffic report, Page was nearly killed in an accident, as the helicopter he was riding aboard crashed near Speedway Senior High School in Speedway, Indiana. Page would fully recover to call the race. Lou Palmer reported from victory lane. Mike Hiss, who had served as a substitute driver for Mario Andretti during time trials, served as the "driver expert."

This would be the 31st and final year for Jim Shelton on the crew. After eleven previous appearances, Fred Agabashian also had departed from the crew.

Television
The race was carried in the United States on ABC Sports on a same-day tape delay basis. Billed as an "ABC Sports Exclusive", the race was introduced with the 1977 song African Symphony, written by Van McCoy, and performed by Saint Tropez. Jim McKay anchored the broadcast.

The broadcast has re-aired on ESPN Classic since May 2011.

The full race broadcast has been available since May 10, 2018 on the official IndyCar Series Youtube channel.

Gallery

Notes

See also
 1978 USAC Championship Car season

References

Works cited
 1978 Indianapolis 500 Official Track Report
 Indianapolis 500 History: Race & All-Time Stats – Official Site
 1978 Indianapolis 500 Radio Broadcast, Indianapolis Motor Speedway Radio Network

Indianapolis 500 races
Indianapolis 500
Indianapolis 500
1978 in American motorsport